The Qiketai Formation is a geological formation in Xinjiang, China. It is found within the Turpan-Hami Basin. It is roughly equivalent in age to the nearby Toutunhe Formation and Wucaiwan Formation of the Southern and Northern Junggar Basin, respectively. Tuffites within the unit have been dated to the Callovian stage of the Jurassic approximately 164.6 ± 1.4 ma. The dinosaur Xinjiangtitan is known from the formation.

References

Jurassic System of Asia
Callovian Stage
Jurassic China